Salome is a feminine name derived from the Hebrew word shalom, meaning "peace".

There are two origins of the name Salome. Salome is the name of a Christian disciple, who was one of the women who witnessed the resurrection of Jesus Christ along with the two Marys (Mark 15:40–16:8). Another Salome (c. early 1st century CE) was the daughter of Herodias, and nemesis of John the Baptist (Mark 6:17–29 and Matt 14:3–11).

The name is currently among the top 10 names given to newborn girls in 2011 in the countries of Georgia and Colombia. It is ranked among the top 100 names for girls in France. It is less popular in the United States, where it does not rank among the top 1,000 names; just 82 newborn girls there were given the name in 2010.

Variants
Salomé, French, Portuguese, Spanish
Solomiia, Solomiya or Solomia, 
Salomea, Polish 
Саломея, Russian
ሰሎሜ, Amharic
Salomėja, Lithuanian
სალომე, Georgian
سالومه، فارسی

People with the given name

 Salomé Afonso (born 1997), Portuguese runner
 Salome Alt (1568–1633), Austrian mistress to the reigning Prince-Archbishop of Salzburg
 Salomè Antonazzoni (fl. 1619 – fl. 1642), Italian stage actress
 Salomé Báncora (born 1993), Argentine alpine skier
 Salomé de Bahia (born 1945), Brazilian vocalist in France
 Salomé Barojas (born 1957), Mexican baseball player
 Salome Bey (1933–2020), American-born Canadian singer-songwriter, composer, and actress
 Salomé Breziner, Belgian-born American film director and screenwriter
 Salome Chachua (born 1990), Georgian ballroom and Latin dancer and choreographer
 Salome Chepchumba (born 1982), Kenyan middle-distance runner
 Salome Clausen, Swiss pop music artist
 Salome Dadiani (1949–1913), Georgian princes
 Salome Dell (born 1993), athlete from Papua New Guinea
 Salome Devidze (born 1986), Georgian tennis player
 Salome Hocking (1859–1927), Cornish novelist
 Salomé de Gélieu (1742–1820), Swiss educator and governess
 Salome Gluecksohn-Waelsch (1907–2007), German-born U.S. geneticist
 Salome Halldorson (1887–1970), Canadian politician in Manitoba
 Salomé Haller (born 1975), French operatic and concert soprano
 Salomé Herrera, Mexican pianist
 Salomé di Iorio (born 1980), Argentine lawyer and football referee
 Salome Jens (born 1935), American actress who appeared in Star Trek: Deep Space Nine
 Salome Kammer (born 1959), German actress, singer and cellist
 Salome Khubuluri (born 1988), Georgian footballer
 Salomé Kora (born 1994), Swiss sprinter
 Salome Lang (born 1997), Swiss athlete who competes in the high jump
 Salomé Leclerc (born 1986), Canadian singer-songwriter
 Salome Maswime, South African clinician and global health expert
 Salome Melia, Georgian chess player
 Salomé Moiane (born 1951), Mozambican politician
 Salome Mulugeta, Ethiopian and Eritrean-American filmmaker and actor
 Salome Nyirarukundo (born 1997), Rwandan long-distance runner
 Salome Pazhava (born 1997), Georgian individual rhythmic gymnast
 Salome Reischer (1899–1980), Austrian chess player
 Salome Samadashvili (born 1976), Georgian politician and former diplomat
 Salome Sellers (1800–1909), American centenarian who was the last known person born in the 18th century
 Salomé Stampfli (born 2005), Liechtensteiner footballer
 Salome Tabuatalei, Fijian athlete and canoeist
 Salome Tanuvasa, New Zealand artist
 Salome Thorkelsdottir (Þorkelsdóttir) (born 1927), Icelandic politician
 Salomé Ureña (1847–1897), poet and teacher from the Dominican Republic
 Salome Zurabishvili, President of the Republic of Georgia

Variants

 Solomiia Bobrovska (born 1989), Ukrainian politician and civic activist
 Solomiya Brateyko (born 1999), Ukrainian table tennis player
 Solomiya Krushelnytska (1872–1952), Ukrainian soprano opera star
 Solomiia Pavlychko (1958–1999), Ukrainian literary critic, philosopher and translator
 Solomiia Vynnyk, Ukrainian freestyle wrestler

Fictional characters
 Salome, a character in the novel The Promise
Salome Otterbourne, a character in Death on the Nile by Agatha Christie

Notes

Feminine given names
Hebrew feminine given names